Steffen Baumgart (born 5 January 1972) is a German football manager and former player who coaches 1. FC Köln.

Playing career
A forward, Baumgart began his professional career at Hansa Rostock in 1995. With a two-year interruption he spent six years with FC Hansa, scoring 32 goals in 185 appearances. In 2002, he moved to Union Berlin, spending two years at Stadion An der Alten Försterei where he became a crowd favourite. In 2004, the club was relegated from 2. Bundesliga, finishing only 17th.

However, Baumgart stayed in the league, moving to Energie Cottbus on a free transfer. There he helped secure the 2. Bundesliga in his first season and won promotion to Bundesliga in 2006. Cottbus managed to not be relegated in their first season in the top flight in Germany, but the next season saw Baumgart hardly playing for the first team, and on 3 January 2008 club and player agreed to a mutual termination of the contract. On 22 January, Regionalliga Nord side 1. FC Magdeburg announced Baumgart had signed a contract until June 2008 with an option for another season. After the club missed out on qualifying to the new 3. Liga, Baumgart's contract was not extended and he left the club for Germania Schöneiche, a club near Berlin.

Baumgart scored 29 goals in 225 Bundesliga matches and 36 goals in 142 matches in the 2. Bundesliga.

Managerial career
On 31 March 2009, he returned to 1. FC Magdeburg as a manager and signed a contract running until the end of the season. His contract was extended at the end of the season, despite a mediocre record in the league. Baumgart had won the FSA-Pokal in 2009, but he was unable to improve upon the results of his predecessor. On the contrary, Magdeburg were ten points behind a promotion spot by the end of December. Following a string of bad results when league play resumed in 2010, Baumgart was let go at the end of March.

In 2017, Baumgart signed with SC Paderborn. Having been saved narrowly the previous year, the club surprisingly finished second in the 2017-18 season and returned to the 2. Bundesliga. In 2019, in a remarkable turn of events, the newly promoted side managed another top-two finish, which returned Paderborn to the Bundesliga after years of turbulence. The 2019–20 season, however, saw the club struggle against Bundesliga competition. Paderborn finished the season in last place with 20 points, which led to their relegation back to the second tier in June 2020. Baumgart's contract at Paderborn was dated until 30 June 2021. In April 2021, it was announced that Baumgart will not extend his contract, and he left the club at the end of the season.

On 11 May 2021, Bundesliga club 1. FC Köln announced that they will appoint Baumgart as manager for the 2021–22 season on a 2-year contract. His first game in charge was a preseason friendly against Bundesliga Champions Bayern Munich, which Baumgart's side won 3-2.

Trivia
In 2021 Baumgart received the award "Bester Fußballspruch des Jahres" (Best football saying of the year) awarded by the german academy for football culture for his saying: "Ein Spiel ist erst vorbei, wenn der Schiedsrichter pfeift und ich nicht mehr brülle." (A game isn't over until the referee whistles and I stop yelling.)

Managerial statistics

References

External links

Living people
1972 births
Sportspeople from Rostock
German footballers
East German footballers
Footballers from Mecklenburg-Western Pomerania
Association football forwards
Bundesliga players
2. Bundesliga players
SpVg Aurich players
FC Hansa Rostock players
VfL Wolfsburg players
1. FC Union Berlin players
FC Energie Cottbus players
1. FC Magdeburg players
SV Germania Schöneiche players
German football managers
Bundesliga managers
2. Bundesliga managers
3. Liga managers
1. FC Magdeburg managers
SC Paderborn 07 managers
1. FC Köln managers
People from Bezirk Rostock